Dick is a nickname most often for Richard, which likely originated in the Middle Ages as rhyming slang for "Rick", as did William →‎ Will →‎ Bill and Robert →‎ Rob →‎ Bob. The modern association with "penis" is more recent, arising from Dick becoming a cliché name for any man, as in Tom, Dick and Harry.

Notable people
 Dick Assman (1934–2016), Canadian gas station worker
 Dick Gregory (1932–2017), American civil rights activist and comedian
 Dick Lee (disambiguation), multiple 
 Dick Wolf American television producer

Business
 Richard S. Fuld Jr. (born 1946), American banker best known as the final chairman and chief executive officer of Lehman Brothers
 Dick Graves (1912-1990), American casino owner
 Dick Smith (entrepreneur), Australian businessman
 Dick Teague (1923–1991), American industrial designer

Crime
 Richard Hickock (1931—1965), one of the murderers of the Clutter family, the subject of the book and film "In Cold Blood"
 Dick Turpin (1705–1739), English highwayman executed for horse theft

Entertainment
 Dick Cavett (born 1936), American television talk show host
 Dick Clark (1929–2012), American radio and television personality
 Dick Contino (1930–2017), American accordionist
 Dick Couch, American writer
 Dick Dale (1937—2019), American musician known as "King of the Surf Guitar"
 Dick Jensen (1942—2006), Musical performer
 Dick King-Smith (1922-2011), English author
 Richard McCourt (born 1976), TV presenter and comedian known for Dick and Dom
 Dick Powell (1930–1963), American actor and musician
 Dick Sargent (1930–1994), American actor
 Dick Shawn (1923–1987), American actor and comedian
 Dick Smothers (born 1939), one of the American folk singer-comedian Smothers Brothers 
 Dick Van Dyke (born 1925), American actor, comedian, writer and producer
 Dick Van Patten (1928–2015), American actor
 Dick York (1928–1992), American actor

Military
 Frederick Ashworth (1912–2005), United States Navy officer
 Richard Joseph Audet (1922–1945), Canadian fighter pilot ace during World War II
Richard "Dick" Halsey Best  (1910-2001) Former commanding officer of Enterprise bombing squadron 6 (VB-6), hit 2 carriers in the Battle of Midway and is credited for sinking the Japanese aircraft carrier Akagi by himself with a singular 1000 lb bomb.
Richard Bong (1920 - 1945), top flying ace of the US during World War II, decorated war hero, National Aviation Hall of Fame inductee
 Richard Marcinko (born 1940), former United States Navy officer and retired Navy SEAL
 Richard Winters (1918–2011), an officer of the United States Army and decorated war veteran

Politics
 Dick Armey (born 1940), American politician and member of US House of Representatives from Texas (1985–2003)
 Dick Cheney (born 1941), American politician who served as the 46th Vice President of the United States from 2001 to 2009
 Dick Clark (senator) (born 1928), American politician and US Senator from Iowa (1973–1979)
 Dick Durbin (born 1944), American politician and US senator from Illinois serving as Senate Majority Whip
 Richard "Dick" Gordon (born 1945), Filipino politician and broadcaster
 Richard Lamm (1935–2021), American politician, writer, Certified Public Accountant, college professor, and lawyer
 Richard Lugar (1932–2019), American Senator who served from 1977 to 2013
 Richard Lyon (1923–2017), United States Navy admiral and former mayor of Oceanside, California
 Dick Thornburgh (1932–2020), American politician, Governor of Pennsylvania (1979–1987), and US Attorney General (1988–1991)

Sports
 Dick Advocaat (born 1947), Dutch football manager and former player
 Dick Ambrose (born 1953), former American football linebacker in the National Football League
 Dick Attlesey (1929–1984), American hurdler
 Dick Ault (1925–2007), American Olympian
 Dick Barber (1910–1983), American long jumper
 Dick Bavetta (born 1939), American retired professional basketball referee for the National Basketball Association (NBA)
 Dick Butkus (born 1942), former American football player, sports commentator, and actor
 Dick Conger (1921–1970), American major league baseball pitcher
 Dick Cox (1897–1966), American baseball player
 Dick Davis (running back) (born 1946), American football player
 Dick Davis (defensive end) (born 1938), American football player
 Dick Deer Slayer, American football player
 Dick Enberg (1935–2017), American sportscaster
 Dick Fencl (1910–1972), American football player
 Dick Groat (born 1930), American baseball and basketball player
 Richard Head (footballer), Australian rules footballer
 Dick Hoblitzell (1888–1962), American Major League Baseball player
 Dick Hurley (1847–aft. 1916), American baseball player
 Dick Ives (1926–1997), American basketball player
 Dick Johnson (footballer) (1895–1933), English footballer
 Dick Johnson (racing driver) (born 1945), Australian touring car driver and team owner
 Dick Johnson (rugby league) (1916–1984), Australian rugby league footballer
 Dick Johnson (sailor) (1923–2005), American sailor
 Dick Johnston (1863–1934), American baseball player
 Dick Johnston (journalist) (1919–2008), Canadian sportswriter
 Dick King (American football) (1895–1930), American football player
 Dick Murdoch (1946–1996), American professional wrestler
 Dick Pole (born 1950), American baseball player and coach
 Dick Pound (born 1942), Canadian swimming champion and first president of the World Anti-Doping Agency
 Dick Reynolds (1915–2002), Australian rules footballer who represented Essendon in the Victorian Football League (VFL)
 Dick Ricketts (1933–1988), American basketball and baseball player
 Dick Rutkowski, diving medicine pioneer
 Dick Savitt (born 1927), American tennis player
 Dick Schweidler (1914–2010), American football player
 Dick Shikat (1897–1968), German professional wrestler and World Heavyweight Champion
 Dick Shiner (born 1942), American football player
 Dick Stanfel (1927–2015), American football player
 Dick Such (born 1944), American baseball player and coach
 Dick Tayler (born 1948), New Zealand long-distance runner
 Dick Trickle (1941–2013), American race car driver
 Dick Vermeil (born 1936), National Football League Coach
 Dick Vitale (born 1939), American basketball sportscaster
 Dick Wagner (baseball) (1927–2006), American baseball executive
 Dick Woodson (born 1945), American baseball player

Fictional characters

 Dick and Jane, main characters in a children's reading book series
 Dick Grayson, the name of Robin and other superheroes in the DC Universe
 Dick Harper, one of the title characters in a 1977 film Fun with Dick and Jane that was remade in 2005
 Dick Loudon, the main character in the TV show Newhart
 Dick Solomon, the High Commander of the alien visitors in 3rd Rock from the Sun  
 Dick Tracy, comic strip referencing another usage of dick as slang for detective
 Dick Whitman, the birth name of Donald Draper, the main character in Mad Men
 Dick Gansey III from The Raven Cycle

See also
 Dickey, Dickie, Dicky

References

 Lists of people by nickname
 English masculine given names